John Bunyan Museum is a museum primarily dedicated to the life, times and works of John Bunyan. The museum is located in Bedford, Bedfordshire, England.

John Bunyan (1628 – 1688), a Christian writer and preacher, was born in Harrowden (one mile south-east of Bedford), in the Parish of Elstow, England. He wrote The Pilgrim's Progress, arguably the most famous published Christian allegory. In the Church of England he is remembered with a Lesser Festival on 30 August.

In 1672, the congregation led by Bunyan purchased a barn which they used to conduct worship. Eventually, a church, which came to be called the Bunyan Meeting Free Church, was built on the site of the barn. In 1849, a second church was built which is still used for services. A separate museum building was constructed in the compound in 1998 and the Bunyan artefacts and memorabilia formerly housed in a small museum room in the church were moved into it.

The museum's displays recreate a number of scenes from Bunyan's life which also show some of Bedford's social history in the seventeenth century. In addition there are artefacts such as Bunyan's iron violin and wooden flute, Bunyan's stoneware jug he used in prison as well as his will and a third edition of The Pilgrim's Progress.

See also
 The Higgins Art Gallery & Museum - Bedford's principle museum and art gallery complex, situated opposite the John Bunyan collection
 Elstow Moot Hall - a medieval market house on Elstow village green, housing a small museum dedicated to seventeenth century life, and the life and works of John Bunyan
 Harlington Manor -The house in which John Bunyan was interrogated and briefly imprisoned in 1660.  It is thought to be the only building still standing in which John Bunyan is known to have stayed

References

External links
 John Bunyan Museum official website
 Moot Hall official website

John Bunyan
Museums in Bedfordshire
Biographical museums in Bedfordshire
Buildings and structures in Bedford
Literary museums in England
Museums established in 1998
1998 establishments in England
English male writers